The Constitution Party, known until 11 February 2006 as the Estonian United People's Party, was a political party in Estonia, mainly supported by the Russian minority.

For the 1995 elections the party formed the "Our Home is Estonia" alliance with the Russian Party in Estonia. The alliance won six seats.

The party held 6 seats in the Riigikogu from 1999 to 2003. At the legislative elections of 2 March 2003, it won 2.2% of the popular vote and got no seats. In 2007's election, it fell further to 5,470 votes (1.0%) and again got no seat; Estonian Internal Security Service alleged there was an active promotion campaign by Russian special services.

On 28 June 2008, it merged with the Estonian Left Party to form the Estonian United Left Party.

Controversy 

According to the Estonian Internal Security Service the Constitution Party was a puppet-party supported and controlled by Russia, created by the Russian Foreign Intelligence Service (SVR) as part of their campaign of "political intelligence manipulations". Also several members of the party have connections with groups such as Nochnoy Dozor.

Election results

References

External links
Official website

Political parties established in 1994
Defunct political parties in Estonia
Russian political parties in Estonia
1994 establishments in Estonia
2008 disestablishments in Estonia
Political parties disestablished in 2008
Russian minority interests parties